LRG Capital Group is a global investment, banking and advisory shop that focuses on public and private companies in the technology, life sciences, hospitality, real estate and entertainment sectors. The firm was founded by Lawrence R. Goldfarb, formerly a managing director in the mergers & acquisitions group at CS First Boston.

LRG provides capital via private equity investments, commercial loans and structured debt financing, and advises clients on mergers and acquisitions, corporate finance advice and other strategic alternatives. Headquartered in San Francisco with offices in New York City and Miami, LRG Capital Group does relationship-focused guidance and financing. 
 
The company has five business units: 

Corporate Advisory Services;
LRG Capital Funds;
LRG Hospitality Group;
LRG Cascade;
Commercial Ventures
Real Estate Ventures.

LRG Capital Group is the investment manager for the LRG BayStar Capital III Investment Fund. Prior BayStar Capital Funds have collectively invested over $1.5 billion of equity in more than 250 companies.

LRG Capital Corporate Advisory Group provides financial advisory and capital-raising agency services and represents clients on equity and debt placements, restructurings, recapitalizations, management buyouts and other strategic alternatives.

LRG Capital Real Estate Ventures invests in and owns various entertainment interests and U.S. and non-U.S. real estate assets, including derivative interests in real estate securities and real estate development projects and properties. LRG Capital Group has also been recognized for its financing expertise in technology, life science and entertainment development ventures and companies throughout the U.S. and abroad.

LRG Capital Commercial Ventures provides flexible investment capital and financing options to businesses across all sectors that are positioned for near-term growth. LRG Commercial Ventures functions as a merchant bank for private companies by utilizing a variety of credit protected and equity participation structures.

See also
LRG Capital Funds
LRG Racing LLC

References

LRG Capital Group Adds Multi-Strategy Hedge Fund to Platform Through Partnership With Admiral Capital Management, LLC 
GE Capital Solutions, Franchise Finance Provides $5.8 Million to Lyons Group Ltd.
Press release: BayStar Capital III Investment Glasshouse Technologies Continues UK Growth Through TPP Acquisition  
Q&A with LRG Hospitality Advisory Shah Bahreyni
Press release: LRG Capital Group Names Shah Bahreyni as Managing Director of Newly Formed Hospitality Group
Press release: LRG Capital Group expands its Corporate Advisory Group with the Addition of Kimberly T. Lynch
LRG Capital, Signature Prep Emerging Market Fund
Press release: LRG Capital Group Makes Second Investment in Japan’s Arque Orion Group
Press release: LRG Capital Group Celebrates Inaugural Year Highlighted by Successful and Diverse Transactions, and Growing Team
BayStar Capital III Fund Investment GlassHouse Technologies Plans IPO
Press release: OM Records Announces Additional Investment by LRG Capital
Press release: Baystar Capital III Investment Fund, L.P. Invests in Virtualscopics, a Premier Provider of Next Generation Imaging Solutions to the Biotechnology and Pharmaceutical Industries
Press release: BayStar Capital III Investment Fund, L.P. agrees to provide up to $16 Million to GlassHouse Technologies, Inc. 
Press release: LRG Capital Group Forms Partnership with Arque Orion Group
Press release: LRG Capital Group Forms Corporate Advisory Services Group
LRG Capital Group’s Arque Orion makes an Investment in IA Global (Amex: IAO) and Taicom Securities

External links
LRG Capital
LRG Capital

Financial services companies of the United States
Companies based in San Francisco